Hermitage, Saint Croix is a settlement on the island of Saint Croix in the United States Virgin Islands. In 2014, Helen Worth, a British Actress well known for her portrayal of the character Gail Platt on the show Coronation Street visited the island and posted a selfie of her there to her Twitter account.

References

Populated places in Saint Croix, U.S. Virgin Islands